Sherry Shah is a Pakistan actress, model and producer. She is known for her roles in dramas Mr. Shamim, Jinnah Ke Naam, Yeh Zindagi Hai and Meri Behan Meri Dewrani.

Early life
Sherry was born in 1986 on 5 May in Karachi, Pakistan. She completed her studies from University of Karachi.

Career
She started modeling. She made her debut as an actress on PTV in 2000. She appeared in drama Wafa on PTV. She was noted for her roles in dramas Yeh Kaisi Mohabbat Ha, Mai Souteli, Mujhay Bhi Khuda Ne Banaya Hai, Haseena Moin Ki Kahani and Jaan Hatheli Par. She also appeared in drama Yeh Zindagi Hai and Yeh Zindagi Hai Season 2 as Pinki which was the longest-running television series. She also appeared in telefilms. Since then she appeared in drama Mr. Shamim, Mr. Shamim Season 2 and Meri Behan Meri Dewrani. In 2019 she appeared in movie Durj as Laali.

Personal life
Sherry married Dr. Malik Anwar in 2013 but got divorced a year later.

Filmography

Television

Telefilm

Film

Awards and nominations

References

External links
 
 
 

1986 births
Living people
Pakistani television actresses
21st-century Pakistani actresses
Pakistani film actresses